John Joseph "Jackie" Warner (born August 1, 1943 in Monrovia, California) is former Major League Baseball player. Warner played for the California Angels in the 1966 season as a right fielder. He played in 45 games in his one-year career. Warner had a .211 batting average, with 26 hits in 123 at-bats.

In 1967, Warner was traded to the Kansas City Athletics with Jack Sanford for Roger Repoz, but never played in a game for them.

External links

1943 births
Living people
California Angels players
Baseball players from California
Major League Baseball outfielders
San Jose Bees players
Tri-City Angels players
Hawaii Islanders players
Seattle Angels players
El Paso Sun Kings players
Jacksonville Suns players
Vancouver Mounties players
Birmingham A's players
Oklahoma City 89ers players